The sixth season of Modern Family premiered on September 24, 2014 on ABC. The sixth season was ordered on May 18, 2014 by ABC. The season was produced by Steven Levitan Productions and Picador Productions in association with 20th Century Fox Television, with creators Steven Levitan and Christopher Lloyd as showrunners. On May 7, 2015, ABC renewed Modern Family for a seventh season.

Cast

Main cast
 Ed O'Neill as Jay Pritchett 
 Sofía Vergara as Gloria Pritchett
 Julie Bowen as Claire Dunphy 
 Ty Burrell as Phil Dunphy 
 Jesse Tyler Ferguson as Mitchell Pritchett 
 Eric Stonestreet as Cameron Tucker
 Sarah Hyland as Haley Dunphy 
 Ariel Winter as Alex Dunphy 
 Nolan Gould as Luke Dunphy 
 Rico Rodriguez as Manny Delgado
 Aubrey Anderson-Emmons as Lily Tucker-Pritchett

Recurring cast
 Steve Zahn as Ronnie LaFontaine
 Andrea Anders as Amber LaFontaine
 Adam DeVine as Andy Bailey

Guest cast

 Rory Scovel as Carl
 Tyne Daly as Mrs. Plank
 Jon Polito as Earl Chambers
 Finneas O'Connell as Ronnie Jr. LaFontaine
 Brooke Sorenson as Tammy LaFontaine
 Ben Lawson as George
 Fiona Gubelmann as Lisa
 Michael Urie as Gavin Sinclair
 Nicholas Gonzalez as Diego
 Nigella Lawson as herself
 Rob Riggle as Gil Thorpe
 Fred Willard as Frank Dunphy
 Stephanie Beatriz as Sonia Ramirez
 Nathan Lane as Pepper Saltzman
 Elizabeth Banks as Sal
 Christian Barillas as Ronaldo
 Penn Jillette as Edward LeGrand
 Natasha Leggero as Dana
 Kevin Daniels as Longines
 Reid Ewing as Dylan Marshall
 Joe Mande as Ben
 Laura Ashley Samuels as Beth
 Robbie Amell as Chase
 Will Sasso as Señor Kaplan
 Alyson Reed as Angela
 Pierce Wallace as Joe Pritchett
 Andrew Daly as Principal Brown
 Benjamin Bratt as Javier Delgado

Episodes

Reception

Reviews
Modern Family's sixth season received positive reviews from television critics, with some claiming it an improvement over the previous couple of seasons that had a mixed critical reception, and a return to form for the show. 

Various writers from The A.V. Club have awarded the majority of episodes a "B" grade or higher - with particular praise for "The Day We Almost Died", "Closet? You'll Love It!" and "Crying Out Loud"- marking an improvement over the repeated "C" grade given throughout the previous season. "Connection Lost" also received high acclaim, with many praising its originality and ability to transcend what could have been a "gimmicky episode". Discussing "Three Turkeys", Fourthmic stated that the episode was "another strong one in season that has seen the series return to the quality that we came to appreciate in the first couple of seasons". In her review for "Closet? You'll Love It!" Gwen Ihnat of The A.V. Club stated that the episode represents "all the reasons why we still watch Modern Family" and awarded the episode an A−.  On the same site, David Kallison reviewed "Grill, Interrupted" and said "This season proves that sitcoms can survive on solid characters and solid jokes".

Sarah Hyland's performance as Haley Dunphy has received consistently positive reviews over the course of the sixth season. In his review for Queer Eyes, Full Hearts Evan Slead labelled her "truly a great comedic actress. She has a way of making the ditzy and superficial type earn some respect and notoriety". Reviewing Rash Decisions, Gwen Ihnat of The A.V. Club labelled Hyland the 'performer of the week', saying "It’s hard to picture a time when this wouldn’t be Sarah Hyland, but Haley continues to be just a whirlwind of delight".

Ratings

References

External links
 

2014 American television seasons
2015 American television seasons
6